Elachista phalaridis is a moth in the family Elachistidae. It was described by Parenti in 1983. It is found in Japan (Honshu).

The length of the forewings is 3.6-3.8 mm for males and 3.8-4.2 mm for females. The forewings are black-brownish, with silver-whitish markings.

References

Moths described in 1983
phalaridis
Moths of Japan